Patrick Orlando Lennon (born April 27, 1968) is an American former professional baseball outfielder. He played in Major League Baseball (MLB) for the Seattle Mariners, Kansas City Royals, Oakland Athletics, and Toronto Blue Jays.

Career
Lennon was drafted by the Seattle Mariners in the 1st round (8th overall) of the 1986 Major League Baseball Draft and made his major league debut for the Mariners on September 15, . He also played in the majors for the Kansas City Royals, Oakland Athletics, and Toronto Blue Jays. From 2002-2005 with two stints in Triple-A in between, Lennon played for the Long Island Ducks of the independent Atlantic League. In his four seasons with the Ducks, he batted .311, .327, .323, and .291.

Personal life
Lennon currently lives in Bayshore, New York.

External links

1968 births
Living people
American expatriate baseball players in Canada
Baseball players from North Carolina
Bellingham Mariners players
Calgary Cannons players
Canton-Akron Indians players
Columbus Clippers players
Durham Bulls players
Edmonton Trappers players
Kansas City Royals players
Long Island Ducks players
Major League Baseball outfielders
Modesto A's players
New Britain Red Sox players
Oakland Athletics players
Ottawa Lynx players
Pawtucket Red Sox players
Salt Lake Buzz players
Seattle Mariners players
Syracuse SkyChiefs players
Toledo Mud Hens players
Toronto Blue Jays players
Trenton Thunder players
Vermont Mariners players
Wausau Timbers players